Olympic Group is an Egyptian group of companies operating mainly in the field of domestic appliances. The main products it manufactures are washing machines, refrigerators, electric water heaters and gas cookers. It also operates in the fields of IT and real estate.  It owns the licensing rights for Sony products in Egypt. Olympic Group has acquired "IDEAL", a formerly state-owned appliances giant.

Major shareholders are the "Sallam" family whose father founded the company.

History
Olympic Group traces its roots back to the 1920s and 1930s. In the 1930s, Olympic Group's founder, Abdallah Sallam started a manufacturing and trading operation selling radios, small appliances and producing electric transformers. By 1950, his enterprise expanded into  retail operations with the establishment of  a chain of stores, “Shaher”, specialized in consumer financing. “Shaher” remained amongst the best performing retailers of household appliances in Egypt until it was nationalized in 1963.

The manufacturing arm of Sallam's operations continued in the form of a new venture, Cairo Light Industries. In the early 1970s, it introduced the first locally produced electric water heaters under the brand name Olympic Electric. This product provided an alternative to the gas water heaters that were popular at the time. It also capitalized on emerging consumer demand for electrical appliances and affordable electrical energy prices as a result of government subsidies.

In 1975, EPA was established as the main trading arm of the group, handling marketing, distribution and after-sales services for all Olympic brand products.

Dr Saad Sallam, the oldest son of the founder, returned to Egypt in 1978 after receiving a Ph.D. in engineering from McMaster University in Ontario and became in charge of running the business, assisted by younger brothers Niazy Sallam, who looked after the trading side and Nabil Sallam who was responsible for the production side of the business.

To accommodate growth and complexity of operations, Olympic Group was established in 1995 as a holding company for subsidiaries engaged in manufacturing and trading of household appliances and related industries.

In 1998, the group enhanced its position in the white goods market with the acquisition of IDEAL, the largest public sector manufacturer of white goods in Egypt. IDEAL, which was established in the 1920s, complemented the Group's product range with refrigerators and washing machines.

Between 1997 and 2004 the group went through restructuring measures and investment projects that aimed at:
  separation of ownership from management
  boosting output capacity and quality
  enhancing business focus
  empowering staff through delegation of authority

Today, the group claims to be the market leader in household appliances in Egypt.

Activities
More than 98% of the products sold by the group are manufactured in their own production facilities.

The main products manufactured by Olympic Group are automatic washing machines, refrigerators, electric water heaters and gas cookers. Other products include fans, oil-filled radiators, exhaust fans, manual washing machines and coolers.

Olympic Group's key international partners, suppliers and licensors include the world's second-largest appliance manufacturer – Electrolux (Zanussi), the Korean giant Daewoo, the leading Dutch manufacturer Philips, the Turkish conglomerate KOC group and Merloni International Group “ARISTON and Indesit”.

Ninety percent of the group's products are introduced into the market through Olympic Group's wholly owned wholesale trader, EPA, which is the largest white goods trader in Egypt. EPA has 12 branches and a network of 1600 dealers and distributors.

The other trading arm of the Group, B-Tech, handles retail operations, with a focus on consumer credit sales. B-Tech was established in 1997 under the trading name “Olympic Stores”. Today B-Tech operates 42 outlets  located at commercial centers in Cairo and other provinces within Egypt. In addition, EPA operates 16 Ideal and Olympic Electric retail outlets and 11 franchise retail outlets.

The core activities of the company are supported with after-sales service network, comprising 25 service centers spread throughout the country.

Contract with P&G
Olympic Group signed a contract with Procter and Gamble for distributing Braun products in Egypt in December 2006.

October 11, 2010- Sweden's Electrolux (ELUXb.ST) has agreed in principle to buy Egypt's Olympic Group (OLGR.CA), the biggest appliance maker in the Middle East and North Africa, in a push to capture growth in emerging markets.

September 18, 2011. Workers started their sit-in, demanding 1 percent of the value of the factory after 52 percent of the factory was sold to Swedish owners.

References

External links
Official Website
Home & Kitchen Appliance Reviews
Electolux Acquisition Of Olympic Group. Reuters Article
El-Madany, Sherine: The Heat is On, Business Today Egypt Article

1963 establishments in Egypt
Manufacturing companies based in Cairo
Manufacturing companies established in 1963
Conglomerate companies of Egypt
Home appliance manufacturers of Egypt
Home appliance brands
Egyptian brands